This is a list of 690 species in Mesochorus, a genus of ichneumon wasps in the family Ichneumonidae.

Mesochorus species

 Mesochorus abolitus Brues, 1910 c g
 Mesochorus aboriginalis Brues, 1910 c g
 Mesochorus abraxator Schwenke, 1989 c g
 Mesochorus abruptus Dasch, 1974 c g
 Mesochorus absonus Dasch, 1974 c g
 Mesochorus aculeatus Dasch, 1974 c g
 Mesochorus aculeus Schwenke, 2002 c g
 Mesochorus acuminatus Thomson, 1886 c g
 Mesochorus acutus Schwenke, 1999 c g
 Mesochorus aestivus Dasch, 1974 c g
 Mesochorus aggestus Schwenke, 2002 c g
 Mesochorus aggressor Fonscolombe, 1852 c g
 Mesochorus agilis Cresson, 1865 c g
 Mesochorus agnellonis Schwenke, 1999 c g
 Mesochorus alajuelicus Dasch, 1974 c g
 Mesochorus alaskensis Dasch, 1971 c g
 Mesochorus albarascae Schwenke, 1999 c g
 Mesochorus albicinctus Dasch, 1974 c g
 Mesochorus albifacies Schwenke, 1999 c g
 Mesochorus albionis Schwenke, 1999 c g
 Mesochorus albolimbatus Schwenke, 1999 c g
 Mesochorus alpestris Dasch, 1974 c g
 Mesochorus alpigenus Strobl, 1904 c g
 Mesochorus alternus Schwenke, 1999 c g
 Mesochorus altissimus Dasch, 1974 c g
 Mesochorus alveus Schwenke, 1999 c g
 Mesochorus amabilis Dasch, 1974 c g
 Mesochorus americanus Cresson, 1872 c g b
 Mesochorus amnicolaris Schwenke, 1999 c g
 Mesochorus amoenus Dasch, 1974 c g
 Mesochorus anglicus Schwenke, 1999 c g
 Mesochorus angularis Dasch, 1974 c g
 Mesochorus angustatus Thomson, 1886 c g
 Mesochorus angustistigmatus Dasch, 1974 c g
 Mesochorus anhalthinus Schwenke, 2002 c g
 Mesochorus annulatus Dasch, 1974 c g
 Mesochorus anomalus Holmgren, 1860 c g
 Mesochorus antefurcalis Constantineanu & Voicu, 1975 c g
 Mesochorus anthracinus Kriechbaumer, 1890 c g
 Mesochorus antilliensis Dasch, 1974 c g
 Mesochorus apantelis Dasch, 1971 c g
 Mesochorus applanatus Dasch, 1971 c g
 Mesochorus aquilonis Schwenke, 1999 c g
 Mesochorus aquilus Dasch, 1974 c g
 Mesochorus aquoreus Dasch, 1974 c g
 Mesochorus aranealis Schwenke, 1999 c g
 Mesochorus aranearum Ratzeburg, 1852 c g
 Mesochorus araucoensis Dasch, 1974 c g
 Mesochorus arcticus Dasch, 1971 c g
 Mesochorus arduus Schwenke, 1999 c g
 Mesochorus arenarius (Haliday, 1838) c g
 Mesochorus areolaris Ratzeburg, 1852 c g
 Mesochorus areolatus Provancher, 1883 c
 Mesochorus argentinicus Dasch, 1974 c g
 Mesochorus argus Schwenke, 1999 c g
 Mesochorus argutus Dasch, 1974 c g
 Mesochorus arietinus Schwenke, 1999 c g
 Mesochorus artus Schwenke, 1999 c g
 Mesochorus asperifrons Dasch, 1971 c g
 Mesochorus asymmetricus Dasch, 1974 c g
 Mesochorus ater Ratzeburg, 1848 c g
 Mesochorus atratus Dasch, 1974 c g
 Mesochorus atricoxalis Kusigemati, 1985 c g
 Mesochorus atriventris Cresson, 1872 c g
 Mesochorus attenuatus Dasch, 1974 c g
 Mesochorus aulacis Dasch, 1974 c g
 Mesochorus aurantiacus Dasch, 1974 c g
 Mesochorus aureus Dasch, 1974 c g
 Mesochorus bahiae Dasch, 1974 c g
 Mesochorus balteatus Dasch, 1971 c g
 Mesochorus basalis Curtis, 1833 c g
 Mesochorus basilewskyi Benoit, 1955 c g
 Mesochorus bavaricus Schwenke, 1999 c g
 Mesochorus bellus Dasch, 1971 c g
 Mesochorus betuletus Schwenke, 1999 c g
 Mesochorus bicinctus Schwenke, 1999 c g
 Mesochorus bicolor Schwenke, 1999 c g
 Mesochorus bipartitus Schwenke, 1999 c g
 Mesochorus bituberculatus Dasch, 1974 c g
 Mesochorus blanditus Dasch, 1974 c g
 Mesochorus bocainensis Dasch, 1974 c g
 Mesochorus boliviensis Dasch, 1974 c g
 Mesochorus boreomontanus Schwenke, 1999 c g
 Mesochorus boreus Schwenke, 1999 c g
 Mesochorus bracatus Schwenke, 1999 c g
 Mesochorus brasiliensis Dasch, 1974 c g
 Mesochorus brevipetiolatus Ratzeburg, 1844 c g
 Mesochorus britannicus Schwenke, 1999 c g
 Mesochorus broccus Dasch, 1974 c g
 Mesochorus brullei Dasch, 1974 c g
 Mesochorus bucculentus Dasch, 1971 c g
 Mesochorus bulbosus Dasch, 1974 c g
 Mesochorus bulgaricus Schwenke, 1999 c g
 Mesochorus bullatus (Dasch, 1974) c g
 Mesochorus caccabatus Dasch, 1974 c g
 Mesochorus cacuminis Schwenke, 1999 c g
 Mesochorus calais Viereck, 1917 c g
 Mesochorus calidus Schwenke, 1999 c g
 Mesochorus caligator Schwenke, 1999 c g
 Mesochorus callidus Dasch, 1974 c g
 Mesochorus callis Schwenke, 1999 c g
 Mesochorus campestris Schwenke, 1999 c g
 Mesochorus canalis Schwenke, 1999 c g
 Mesochorus canaveseus Schwenke, 1999 c g
 Mesochorus capeki Schwenke, 2002 c g
 Mesochorus carceratus Brues, 1910 c g
 Mesochorus carinatus Schwenke, 1999 c g
 Mesochorus carinifrons Dasch, 1974 c g
 Mesochorus carintiacus Schwenke, 2004 c g
 Mesochorus carolinensis Dasch, 1971 c g
 Mesochorus castaneus Uchida, 1933 c g
 Mesochorus castellanus Schwenke, 1999 c g
 Mesochorus cataclysmi Brues, 1910 c g
 Mesochorus cestus Dasch, 1974 c g
 Mesochorus chasseralis Schwenke, 1999 c g
 Mesochorus chilensis Dasch, 1974 c g
 Mesochorus cholulaensis Dasch, 1974 c g
 Mesochorus chrysurus Dasch, 1974 c g
 Mesochorus cimbicis Ratzeburg, 1844 c g
 Mesochorus cinctus Schwenke, 1999 c g
 Mesochorus cingulatus Dasch, 1974 c g
 Mesochorus circinus Dasch, 1974 c g
 Mesochorus claristigmaticus Morley, 1913 c g
 Mesochorus clarus Schwenke, 1999 c g
 Mesochorus clinatus Dasch, 1974 c g
 Mesochorus coartatus Schwenke, 2002 c g
 Mesochorus cognatus Schwenke, 1999 c g
 Mesochorus columbiae Dasch, 1974 c g
 Mesochorus columbinus Schwenke, 1999 c g
 Mesochorus compressus Dasch, 1974 c g
 Mesochorus comptus Dasch, 1974 c g
 Mesochorus concavus Dasch, 1974 c g
 Mesochorus concolor Szepligeti, 1914 c g
 Mesochorus conicus Dasch, 1974 c g
 Mesochorus conjunctus Dasch, 1974 c g
 Mesochorus conspicuus Schwenke, 2002 c g
 Mesochorus constrictus Schwenke, 2002 c g
 Mesochorus contractus Ratzeburg, 1848 c g
 Mesochorus convallis Schwenke, 2002 c g
 Mesochorus convexus Dasch, 1974 c g
 Mesochorus coreensis Lee & Suh, 1991 c g
 Mesochorus coronatus Dasch, 1971 c g
 Mesochorus costaricensis Dasch, 1974 c g
 Mesochorus cracentis Dasch, 1974 c g
 Mesochorus crassimanus Holmgren, 1860 c g
 Mesochorus cristatus Dasch, 1974 c g
 Mesochorus cubensis Dasch, 1974 c g
 Mesochorus culmosus Dasch, 1974 c g
 Mesochorus cupreatus Dasch, 1971 c g
 Mesochorus curvicauda Thomson, 1886 c
 Mesochorus curvulus Thomson, 1886 c g
 Mesochorus cuspidatus Lee & Suh, 1993 c
 Mesochorus cuzcoensis Dasch, 1974 c g
 Mesochorus cyparissiae Schwenke, 2002 c g
 Mesochorus daedalus Dasch, 1974 c g
 Mesochorus debilis Dasch, 1974 c g
 Mesochorus deceptus Dasch, 1974 c g
 Mesochorus declinans Habermehl, 1922 c g
 Mesochorus decoratus Wilkinson, 1927 c g
 Mesochorus deficiens Dasch, 1974 c g
 Mesochorus deletus Dasch, 1971 c g
 Mesochorus dentatus Dasch, 1971 c g
 Mesochorus dentus Kusigemati, 1985 c g
 Mesochorus depressus (Dasch, 1974) c g
 Mesochorus desertorum Dasch, 1974 c g
 Mesochorus dessauensis Schwenke, 1999 c g
 Mesochorus dilatus Dasch, 1974 c g
 Mesochorus dilleri Schwenke, 1999 c g
 Mesochorus dilobatus Schwenke, 1999 c g
 Mesochorus dilutus Ratzeburg, 1844 c g
 Mesochorus diluvius Schwenke, 1999 c g
 Mesochorus dimidiator Aubert, 1970 c g
 Mesochorus dimidiatus Holmgren, 1860 c g
 Mesochorus discitergus (Say, 1835) c g b
 Mesochorus discolor Schwenke, 1999 c g
 Mesochorus dispar Brischke, 1880 c g
 Mesochorus dissimilis Dasch, 1974 c g
 Mesochorus dissitus Dasch, 1974 c g
 Mesochorus distentus Dasch, 1971 c g
 Mesochorus divaricatus Dasch, 1971 c g
 Mesochorus divergentus Schwenke, 2002 c g
 Mesochorus diversus Dasch, 1974 c g
 Mesochorus doleri Schwenke, 1999 c g
 Mesochorus dolorosus Marshall, 1877 c g
 Mesochorus dolosus Dasch, 1974 c g
 Mesochorus dormitorius Brues, 1910 c g
 Mesochorus doryssus Dasch, 1974 c g
 Mesochorus dreisbachi Dasch, 1971 c g
 Mesochorus dumosus Schwenke, 1999 c g
 Mesochorus ebenus Dasch, 1974 c g
 Mesochorus ecuadorensis Dasch, 1974 c g
 Mesochorus eichhorni Schwenke, 1999 c g
 Mesochorus ejuncidus Dasch, 1971 c g
 Mesochorus elegans Dasch, 1974 c g
 Mesochorus elongatus Dasch, 1971 c g
 Mesochorus emaciatus Dasch, 1974 c g
 Mesochorus ensifer Dasch, 1974 c g
 Mesochorus errabundus Hartig, 1838 c g
 Mesochorus eruditus Dasch, 1974 c g
 Mesochorus erythraeus Dasch, 1971 c g
 Mesochorus eusubtilis Schwenke, 2002 c g
 Mesochorus eximius Dasch, 1974 c g
 Mesochorus expansus Dasch, 1974 c g
 Mesochorus exquisitus Schwenke, 1999 c g
 Mesochorus exsertus Dasch, 1971 c g
 Mesochorus extensator Schwenke, 2002 c g
 Mesochorus extensus Dasch, 1974 c g
 Mesochorus extraordinarius Schwenke, 1999 c g
 Mesochorus extremus Dasch, 1974 c g
 Mesochorus facetus Dasch, 1974 c g
 Mesochorus faciator Horstmann, 2003 c g
 Mesochorus falcatus Dasch, 1974 c g
 Mesochorus fallax Dasch, 1974 c g
 Mesochorus fastigatus Dasch, 1974 c g
 Mesochorus fastuosus Dasch, 1974 c g
 Mesochorus femoralis Brischke, 1880 c g
 Mesochorus fennicus Schwenke, 1999 c g
 Mesochorus ferrugineus Dasch, 1974 c g
 Mesochorus filicornis Dasch, 1974 c g
 Mesochorus flaemingus Schwenke, 1999 c g
 Mesochorus flammeus Dasch, 1974 c g
 Mesochorus flavidus Dasch, 1971 c g
 Mesochorus flavimaculatus Dasch, 1974 c g
 Mesochorus flexus Schwenke, 1999 c g
 Mesochorus fluvialis Schwenke, 2002 c g
 Mesochorus foersteri Dasch, 1971 c g
 Mesochorus fragilis Morley, 1913 c g
 Mesochorus fraterculus Schwenke, 1999 c g
 Mesochorus fraudulentus Dasch, 1974 c g
 Mesochorus frigidus Schwenke, 1999 c g
 Mesochorus frondosus Schwenke, 1999 c g
 Mesochorus fulgurans Curtis, 1833 c g
 Mesochorus fulgurator Horstmann, 2006 c g
 Mesochorus fuliginatus Dasch, 1971 c g
 Mesochorus fulvipes Schwenke, 1999 c g
 Mesochorus funestus Dasch, 1974 c g
 Mesochorus furvus Dasch, 1974 c g
 Mesochorus fuscicornis Brischke, 1880 c g
 Mesochorus fuscus Schwenke, 1999 c g
 Mesochorus gallicator Aubert, 1963 c g
 Mesochorus gardanus Schwenke, 1999 c g
 Mesochorus gelidus Dasch, 1971 c g
 Mesochorus gemellus Holmgren, 1860 c g
 Mesochorus gemmatus Dasch, 1971 c g
 Mesochorus georgievi Schwenke, 2004 c g
 Mesochorus giaglioneus Schwenke, 1999 c g
 Mesochorus gibbosus Schwenke, 1999 c g
 Mesochorus giberius (Thunberg, 1822) c g b
 Mesochorus gilvus Schwenke, 1999 c g
 Mesochorus gladiator Schwenke, 1999 c g
 Mesochorus gladiatus Dasch, 1974 c g
 Mesochorus glaucus Dasch, 1974 c g
 Mesochorus globulator (Thunberg, 1822) c g
 Mesochorus gracilentus Brischke, 1880 c g
 Mesochorus gracilis Brischke, 1880 c g
 Mesochorus grandidentatus Dasch, 1974 c g
 Mesochorus grandisops Dasch, 1971 c g
 Mesochorus gravis Schwenke, 1999 c g
 Mesochorus grenadensis Ashmead, 1900 c g
 Mesochorus haeselbarthi Schwenke, 1999 c g
 Mesochorus halticae Schwenke, 1999 c g
 Mesochorus hamatus Townes, 1945 c g
 Mesochorus hashimotoi Kusigemati, 1985 c g
 Mesochorus hastatus Dasch, 1974 c g
 Mesochorus hebraicator Aubert, 1970 c g
 Mesochorus herero Enderlein, 1914 c g
 Mesochorus hesperus Dasch, 1971 c g
 Mesochorus heterodon Horstmann, 2006 c g
 Mesochorus hidalgoensis Dasch, 1974 c g
 Mesochorus hilaris Dasch, 1974 c g
 Mesochorus hirticoleus Dasch, 1971 c g
 Mesochorus hispidus Dasch, 1974 c g
 Mesochorus hollandicus Schwenke, 2004 c g
 Mesochorus holmgreni Dasch, 1971 c g
 Mesochorus horcomollensis Dasch, 1974 c g
 Mesochorus horstmanni Schwenke, 1999 c g
 Mesochorus hortensis Schwenke, 1999 c g
 Mesochorus hyalinus Dasch, 1974 c g
 Mesochorus ibericus Schwenke, 1999 c g
 Mesochorus iburganus Schwenke, 1999 c g
 Mesochorus ichneutese Uchida, 1955 c g
 Mesochorus ignotus Dasch, 1974 c g
 Mesochorus illustris Schwenke, 1999 c g
 Mesochorus imitatus Dasch, 1971 c g
 Mesochorus impiger Tosquinet, 1903 c g
 Mesochorus impolitus Dasch, 1974 c g
 Mesochorus impunctatus Dasch, 1974 c g
 Mesochorus inaequalis Dasch, 1974 c g
 Mesochorus inaequidens Dasch, 1971 c g
 Mesochorus incae Dasch, 1974 c g
 Mesochorus incisus Dasch, 1974 c g
 Mesochorus inclusus Schwenke, 2002 c g
 Mesochorus incomptus Dasch, 1974 c g
 Mesochorus incultus Dasch, 1971 c g
 Mesochorus indagator Dasch, 1974 c g
 Mesochorus infacetus Dasch, 1974 c g
 Mesochorus infensus Dasch, 1974 c g
 Mesochorus inflatus Dasch, 1971 c g
 Mesochorus infractus Dasch, 1974 c g
 Mesochorus infuscatus Dasch, 1971 c g
 Mesochorus ingentis Schwenke, 1999 c g
 Mesochorus inimicus Dasch, 1974 c g
 Mesochorus iniquus Schwenke, 1999 c g
 Mesochorus inobseptus Dasch, 1971 c g
 Mesochorus insignatus Dasch, 1974 c g
 Mesochorus insolitus Dasch, 1974 c g
 Mesochorus instriatus Kusigemati, 1985 c g
 Mesochorus insularis Schwenke, 1999 c g
 Mesochorus integer Dasch, 1974 c g
 Mesochorus intermissus Schwenke, 1999 c g
 Mesochorus interruptus Kusigemati, 1988 c g
 Mesochorus interstitialis Kusigemati, 1985 c g
 Mesochorus intonsus Dasch, 1971 c g
 Mesochorus inurbanus Dasch, 1974 c g
 Mesochorus inversus Schwenke, 1999 c g
 Mesochorus iridescens Cresson, 1879 c g
 Mesochorus iugosus Schwenke, 2002 c g
 Mesochorus jacobus Schwenke, 1999 c g
 Mesochorus jamaicae Dasch, 1974 c g
 Mesochorus japonicus Kusigemati, 1985 c g
 Mesochorus jenensis Schwenke, 2002 c g
 Mesochorus jenniferae Schwenke, 2002 c g
 Mesochorus jihyetanus Kusigemati, 1985 c g
 Mesochorus jucundus Provancher, 1883 c g
 Mesochorus jugicola Strobl, 1904 c g
 Mesochorus junctus Dasch, 1974 c g
 Mesochorus juranus Schwenke, 1999 c g
 Mesochorus kamouraskae Dasch, 1971 c g
 Mesochorus kansensis Dasch, 1971 c g
 Mesochorus kentuckiensis Dasch, 1971 c g
 Mesochorus kirunae Schwenke, 1999 c g
 Mesochorus kumatai Kusigemati, 1988 c g
 Mesochorus kumganensis Lee & Suh, 1993 c g
 Mesochorus kuwayamae Matsumura, 1926 c g
 Mesochorus laboriosus Dasch, 1974 c g
 Mesochorus lacassus Schwenke, 1999 c g
 Mesochorus lacus Schwenke, 1999 c g
 Mesochorus laevigatus Dasch, 1974 c g
 Mesochorus lanceolatus Schwenke, 1999 c g
 Mesochorus lapideus Brues, 1910 c g
 Mesochorus lapponicus Thomson, 1885 c g
 Mesochorus larentiae Schwenke, 1999 c g
 Mesochorus laricis Hartig, 1838 c g
 Mesochorus lateralis Dasch, 1974 c g
 Mesochorus latus Schwenke, 1999 c g
 Mesochorus lautus Dasch, 1974 c g
 Mesochorus leviculus Dasch, 1974 c g
 Mesochorus lilioceriphilus Schwenke, 2000 c g
 Mesochorus limae Dasch, 1974 c g
 Mesochorus limbatus Dasch, 1974 c g
 Mesochorus liquidus Schwenke, 2002 c g
 Mesochorus lituratus Dasch, 1974 c g
 Mesochorus lobaticola Benoit, 1955 c g
 Mesochorus lobatus Dasch, 1974 c g
 Mesochorus longicoleus Dasch, 1974 c g
 Mesochorus longidens Dasch, 1974 c g
 Mesochorus longidentatus Dasch, 1974 c g
 Mesochorus longiscutatus Dasch, 1971 c g
 Mesochorus longistigma Schwenke, 2002 c g
 Mesochorus longurius Schwenke, 1999 c g
 Mesochorus luminis Schwenke, 1999 c g
 Mesochorus lunarius Schwenke, 1999 c g
 Mesochorus luridipes Schwenke, 1999 c g
 Mesochorus luteipes Cresson, 1872 c g
 Mesochorus luteocinctus Dasch, 1974 c g
 Mesochorus luteolus Dasch, 1974 c g
 Mesochorus lydae Ratzeburg, 1848 c g
 Mesochorus macilentus Dasch, 1974 c g
 Mesochorus macrophyae Schwenke, 1999 c g
 Mesochorus maculatus Dasch, 1974 c g
 Mesochorus maculitibia Costa Lima, 1950 c g
 Mesochorus magnicrus Dasch, 1974 c g
 Mesochorus magnus Dasch, 1974 c g
 Mesochorus malaiseus Schwenke, 1999 c g
 Mesochorus maleficus Dasch, 1971 c g
 Mesochorus mandibularis Lee & Suh, 1991 c g
 Mesochorus marcapatae Dasch, 1974 c g
 Mesochorus martinus Schwenke, 1999 c g
 Mesochorus marylandicus Dasch, 1971 c g
 Mesochorus masoni Dasch, 1971 c g
 Mesochorus matucanae Dasch, 1974 c g
 Mesochorus maurus Dasch, 1974 c g
 Mesochorus maximus Schwenke, 1999 c g
 Mesochorus medius Dasch, 1974 c g
 Mesochorus melalophacharopse Kusigemati, 1985 c g
 Mesochorus melanothorax Wilkinson, 1927 c g
 Mesochorus melinus Dasch, 1974 c g
 Mesochorus melleus Cresson, 1872 c g
 Mesochorus mellis Schwenke, 1999 c g
 Mesochorus mellumiensis Schwenke, 1999 c g
 Mesochorus meridionator Aubert, 1966 c g
 Mesochorus messaureus Schwenke, 1999 c g
 Mesochorus microbathros Kusigemati, 1985 c g
 Mesochorus miniatus Dasch, 1974 c g
 Mesochorus minowai Uchida, 1929 c g
 Mesochorus minutulus Schwenke, 1999 c g
 Mesochorus mirabilis Schwenke, 1999 c g
 Mesochorus mirandae Dasch, 1974 c g
 Mesochorus moabae Dasch, 1971 c g
 Mesochorus modestus Dasch, 1974 c g
 Mesochorus molestus Dasch, 1974 c g
 Mesochorus monacensis Schwenke, 1999 c g
 Mesochorus monomaculatus Kusigemati, 1985 c g
 Mesochorus montanus Dasch, 1974 c g
 Mesochorus montis Schwenke, 1999 c g
 Mesochorus morenator Schwenke, 1999 c g
 Mesochorus moskwanus Schwenke, 1999 c g
 Mesochorus mucronatus Dasch, 1974 c g
 Mesochorus mulleolus Dasch, 1974 c g
 Mesochorus mulleri Schwenke, 1999 c g
 Mesochorus multilineatus Dasch, 1974 c g
 Mesochorus multipunctatus Dasch, 1974 c g
 Mesochorus muscosus Dasch, 1974 c g
 Mesochorus myrtilli Schwenke, 1999 c g
 Mesochorus naknekensis Dasch, 1971 c g
 Mesochorus naturnsis Schwenke, 2002 c g
 Mesochorus necatorius Dasch, 1974 c g
 Mesochorus neglectus Dasch, 1974 c g
 Mesochorus nematus Schwenke, 2004 c g
 Mesochorus nemus Schwenke, 2002 c g
 Mesochorus nepalensis Kusigemati, 1988 c g
 Mesochorus neuquenensis Dasch, 1974 c g
 Mesochorus nichelinus Schwenke, 2002 c g
 Mesochorus niger (Dasch, 1974) c g
 Mesochorus nigrifemoratus Dasch, 1974 c g
 Mesochorus nigrithorax Kiss, 1926 c g
 Mesochorus nigritulus Dasch, 1974 c g
 Mesochorus nikolauseus Schwenke, 2004 c g
 Mesochorus nitidus Schwenke, 1999 c g
 Mesochorus nkulius Benoit, 1955 c g
 Mesochorus noctivagus Viereck, 1905 c g
 Mesochorus norrbyneus Schwenke, 1999 c g
 Mesochorus notialis Dasch, 1974 c g
 Mesochorus novateutoniae Dasch, 1974 c g
 Mesochorus nox Morley, 1926 c g
 Mesochorus noxiosus Dasch, 1974 c g
 Mesochorus nuncupator (Panzer, 1800) c g
 Mesochorus oaxacae Dasch, 1974 c g
 Mesochorus obliterator Aubert, 1965 c g
 Mesochorus obliteratus Dasch, 1971 c g
 Mesochorus oblitus Dasch, 1974 c g
 Mesochorus obscurus Dasch, 1974 c g
 Mesochorus obsoletus Dasch, 1971 c g
 Mesochorus olerum Curtis, 1833 c g
 Mesochorus olitorius Schwenke, 1999 c g
 Mesochorus ontariensis Dasch, 1971 c g
 Mesochorus opacus Schwenke, 1999 c g
 Mesochorus oppacheus Schwenke, 1999 c g
 Mesochorus oranjeanus Schwenke, 2004 c g
 Mesochorus orbis Schwenke, 1999 c g
 Mesochorus orbitalis Holmgren, 1860 c g
 Mesochorus orestes Dasch, 1974 c g
 Mesochorus orientalis (Viereck, 1912) c g
 Mesochorus ornatus Wilkinson, 1927 c g
 Mesochorus oshobotrianus Schwenke, 2002 c g
 Mesochorus ottawaensis (Harrington, 1892) c g
 Mesochorus ovimaculatus Schwenke, 1999 c g
 Mesochorus owenae Schwenke, 1999 c g
 Mesochorus oxfordensis Schwenke, 1999 c g
 Mesochorus palanderi Holmgren, 1869 c g
 Mesochorus palinensis Dasch, 1974 c g
 Mesochorus palliolatus Dasch, 1974 c g
 Mesochorus pallipes Brischke, 1880 c g
 Mesochorus palmaricus Dasch, 1974 c g
 Mesochorus palus Schwenke, 1999 c g
 Mesochorus panamensis Dasch, 1974 c g
 Mesochorus paraensis Dasch, 1974 c g
 Mesochorus parallelus Dasch, 1971 c g
 Mesochorus parilis Kusigemati, 1988 c g
 Mesochorus parvioculatus Schwenke, 1999 c g
 Mesochorus parvus Dasch, 1971 c g
 Mesochorus pascuus Schwenke, 1999 c g
 Mesochorus paulus Dasch, 1971 c g
 Mesochorus pectinatus Szepligeti, 1901 c g
 Mesochorus pectinellus Horstmann, 2006 c g
 Mesochorus pectinipes Bridgman, 1883 c g
 Mesochorus pektusanus Lee & Suh, 1993 c g
 Mesochorus peltatus Dasch, 1971 c g
 Mesochorus pelvis Schwenke, 2002 c g
 Mesochorus pentagonalis Dasch, 1974 c g
 Mesochorus peremptor Dasch, 1974 c g
 Mesochorus perforatus Schwenke, 2002 c g
 Mesochorus perniciosus Viereck, 1911 c g
 Mesochorus personatus Dasch, 1971 c g
 Mesochorus perticatus Schwenke, 1999 c g
 Mesochorus perugianus Schwenke, 1999 c g
 Mesochorus peruvianus Dasch, 1974 c g
 Mesochorus petilus Dasch, 1974 c g
 Mesochorus petiolaris Brischke, 1880 c g
 Mesochorus petiolus Schwenke, 2002 c g
 Mesochorus pharaonis Schwenke, 1999 c g
 Mesochorus philippinensis Ashmead, 1904 c g
 Mesochorus phyllodectae Schwenke, 1999 c g
 Mesochorus piceanus Schwenke, 1999 c g
 Mesochorus piceus Dasch, 1974 c g
 Mesochorus picticrus Thomson, 1886 c
 Mesochorus pictilis Holmgren, 1860 c g
 Mesochorus piemontensis Schwenke, 1999 c g
 Mesochorus pieridicola (Packard, 1881) c g
 Mesochorus pilicornis (Cameron, 1907) c g
 Mesochorus pilosus Dasch, 1974 c g
 Mesochorus pinarae Girault, 1932 c g
 Mesochorus pini Schwenke, 1999 c g
 Mesochorus pizzighettoneus Schwenke, 1999 c g
 Mesochorus placitus Dasch, 1974 c g
 Mesochorus planus Dasch, 1974 c g
 Mesochorus platygorytos Dasch, 1971 c g
 Mesochorus plebejanus Schwenke, 1999 c g
 Mesochorus plumosus Dasch, 1971 c g
 Mesochorus politus Gravenhorst, 1829 c g
 Mesochorus postfurcalis Kokujev, 1927 c g
 Mesochorus praeclarus Dasch, 1974 c g
 Mesochorus probus Benoit, 1955 c g
 Mesochorus procerus Dasch, 1974 c g
 Mesochorus prolatus Dasch, 1971 c g
 Mesochorus prolixus Dasch, 1974 c g
 Mesochorus prominens Dasch, 1974 c g
 Mesochorus properatus Dasch, 1974 c g
 Mesochorus prothoracicus Schwenke, 1999 c g
 Mesochorus provocator Aubert, 1965 c g
 Mesochorus pueblicus Dasch, 1974 c g
 Mesochorus pullatus Dasch, 1974 c g
 Mesochorus pullus Schwenke, 1999 c g
 Mesochorus pumilionis Schwenke, 1999 c g
 Mesochorus pumilus Dasch, 1974 c g
 Mesochorus punctifrons Dasch, 1971 c g
 Mesochorus punctipleuris Thomson, 1886 c g
 Mesochorus pungens Schwenke, 1999 c g
 Mesochorus pusillus Dasch, 1974 c g
 Mesochorus puteolus Dasch, 1974 c g
 Mesochorus pyramideus Schwenke, 1999 c g
 Mesochorus pyrenaeus Schwenke, 1999 c g
 Mesochorus quercus Schwenke, 2004 c g
 Mesochorus rallus Dasch, 1974 c g
 Mesochorus recurvatus Dasch, 1971 c g
 Mesochorus reflexus Dasch, 1974 c g
 Mesochorus remotus Dasch, 1974 c g
 Mesochorus repandus Dasch, 1974 c g
 Mesochorus restrictus Dasch, 1971 c g
 Mesochorus revocatus Brues, 1910 c g
 Mesochorus rhadinus Dasch, 1974 c g
 Mesochorus rilaensis Schwenke, 2002 c g
 Mesochorus riparius Schwenke, 1999 c g
 Mesochorus rivanus Schwenke, 1999 c g
 Mesochorus robustus Schwenke, 1999 c g
 Mesochorus roccanus Schwenke, 1999 c g
 Mesochorus rubeculus Hartig, 1838 c g
 Mesochorus rubidus Dasch, 1974 c g
 Mesochorus rubranotatus Kusigemati, 1985 c g
 Mesochorus rudis Dasch, 1974 c g
 Mesochorus ruficornis Brischke, 1880 c g
 Mesochorus rufithorax Dasch, 1974 c g
 Mesochorus rufoniger Brischke, 1880 c g
 Mesochorus rufopetiolatus Schwenke, 1999 c g
 Mesochorus rugatus Lee & Suh, 1993 c g
 Mesochorus rupesus Schwenke, 1999 c g
 Mesochorus russatus Dasch, 1974 c g
 Mesochorus rusticus Dasch, 1974 c g
 Mesochorus rutilus Schwenke, 2002 c g
 Mesochorus sabulosus Dasch, 1971 c g
 Mesochorus salicis Thomson, 1886 c g
 Mesochorus samarae Schwenke, 1999 c g
 Mesochorus sardegnae Schwenke, 1999 c g
 Mesochorus savoianus Schwenke, 2004 c g
 Mesochorus sawoniewiczi Schwenke, 1999 c g
 Mesochorus scabrosus Dasch, 1971 c g
 Mesochorus scandinavicus Schwenke, 1999 c g
 Mesochorus scaramozzinoi Schwenke, 1999 c g
 Mesochorus schwarzi Schwenke, 1999 c g
 Mesochorus scopulus Schwenke, 1999 c g
 Mesochorus scorteus Dasch, 1974 c g
 Mesochorus scrobiculatus Dasch, 1974 c g
 Mesochorus sculpturatus Benoit, 1955 c g
 Mesochorus scutellaris Schwenke, 2004 c g
 Mesochorus sedis Schwenke, 1999 c g
 Mesochorus semirufus Holmgren, 1860 c g
 Mesochorus seniculus Dasch, 1974 c g
 Mesochorus seorakensis Lee & Suh, 1997 c g
 Mesochorus septentrionalis Schwenke, 1999 c g
 Mesochorus sicculus Dasch, 1974 c g
 Mesochorus similaris Dasch, 1974 c g
 Mesochorus similis Schwenke, 2002 c g
 Mesochorus sinaloensis Dasch, 1974 c g
 Mesochorus sincerus Schwenke, 1999 c g
 Mesochorus skaneus Schwenke, 1999 c g
 Mesochorus slawicus Schwenke, 1999 c g
 Mesochorus soderlundi Schwenke, 1999 c g
 Mesochorus solidus Dasch, 1971 c g
 Mesochorus solitarius Dasch, 1974 c g
 Mesochorus solus Schwenke, 1999 c g
 Mesochorus sordidus Schwenke, 1999 c g
 Mesochorus speciosus Dasch, 1974 c g
 Mesochorus spessartaeus Schwenke, 1999 c g
 Mesochorus spilotus Dasch, 1974 c g
 Mesochorus spinosus Dasch, 1971 c g
 Mesochorus stenotus Dasch, 1974 c g
 Mesochorus sternalis Schwenke, 1999 c g
 Mesochorus stigmator (Thunberg, 1822) c g
 Mesochorus stigmatus Kusigemati, 1985 c g
 Mesochorus strigosus Dasch, 1974 c g
 Mesochorus stubaianus Schwenke, 2004 c g
 Mesochorus styriacus Schwenke, 2002 c g
 Mesochorus subfuscus Schwenke, 1999 c g
 Mesochorus sublimis Schwenke, 1999 c g
 Mesochorus subtilis Dasch, 1974 c g
 Mesochorus subulatus Dasch, 1974 c g
 Mesochorus sufflatus Schwenke, 1999 c g
 Mesochorus sulcatus Dasch, 1971 c g
 Mesochorus sulcifer Dasch, 1974 c g
 Mesochorus sulphuripes Brischke, 1880 c g
 Mesochorus suomiensis Schwenke, 1999 c g
 Mesochorus superbus Schwenke, 1999 c g
 Mesochorus surinamensis Dasch, 1974 c g
 Mesochorus svenssoni Schwenke, 1999 c g
 Mesochorus tachinae Ashmead, 1898 c g
 Mesochorus tachinidaeus Schwenke, 2002 c g
 Mesochorus taeniatus Dasch, 1974 c g
 Mesochorus taiwanensis Kusigemati, 1985 c g
 Mesochorus takizawai Kusigemati, 1985 c g
 Mesochorus tantillus Dasch, 1971 c g
 Mesochorus tarnabyanus Schwenke, 1999 c g
 Mesochorus tattakensis Uchida, 1933 c g
 Mesochorus temporalis Thomson, 1886 c
 Mesochorus tenebricosus Dasch, 1974 c g
 Mesochorus tenthredinidis Schwenke, 1999 c g
 Mesochorus tenuigenae Schwenke, 1999 c g
 Mesochorus tenuis Schwenke, 1999 c g
 Mesochorus tenuiscapus Thomson, 1886 c g
 Mesochorus terebratus Schwenke, 1999 c g
 Mesochorus terminalis Dasch, 1974 c g
 Mesochorus terrosus Brues, 1910 c g
 Mesochorus testaceus Gravenhorst, 1829 c g
 Mesochorus tetricus Holmgren, 1860 c g
 Mesochorus tibialis Schwenke, 2002 c g
 Mesochorus tipularius Gravenhorst, 1829 c g
 Mesochorus torosus Dasch, 1974 c g
 Mesochorus totonacus Cresson, 1872 c g
 Mesochorus townesi Schwenke, 1999 c g
 Mesochorus transversus Dasch, 1971 c g
 Mesochorus trentinus Schwenke, 1999 c g
 Mesochorus triangularis Dasch, 1974 c g
 Mesochorus triangulus Schwenke, 1999 c g
 Mesochorus trifoveatus Schwenke, 2004 c g
 Mesochorus triquetrus Dasch, 1974 c g
 Mesochorus trisulcatus Viereck, 1912 c g
 Mesochorus trossulus Dasch, 1974 c g
 Mesochorus tuberculiger Thomson, 1886 c g
 Mesochorus tucumanensis Dasch, 1974 c g
 Mesochorus tumidifrons Dasch, 1971 c g
 Mesochorus tumidus Dasch, 1974 c g
 Mesochorus tundracolus Dasch, 1971 c g
 Mesochorus turbidus Schwenke, 1999 c g
 Mesochorus turgidus Dasch, 1974 c g
 Mesochorus tyroliensis Schwenke, 1999 c g
 Mesochorus ukiahensis Dasch, 1971 c g
 Mesochorus unicarinatus Dasch, 1971 c g
 Mesochorus uniformis Cresson, 1872 c g b
 Mesochorus vafer Dasch, 1974 c g
 Mesochorus valdierius Schwenke, 1999 c g
 Mesochorus validus Dasch, 1971 c g
 Mesochorus varianus Dasch, 1971 c g
 Mesochorus varius Schwenke, 1999 c g
 Mesochorus vejanus Schwenke, 1999 c g
 Mesochorus velatus Dasch, 1974 c g
 Mesochorus velox Holmgren, 1860 c g
 Mesochorus veluminis Schwenke, 1999 c g
 Mesochorus venerandus Schwenke, 1999 c g
 Mesochorus venustus Dasch, 1974 c g
 Mesochorus veracruzi Dasch, 1974 c g
 Mesochorus verecundus Dasch, 1974 c g
 Mesochorus versicolor Dasch, 1974 c g
 Mesochorus versiculus Dasch, 1974 c g
 Mesochorus versuranus Schwenke, 1999 c g
 Mesochorus versutus Dasch, 1974 c g
 Mesochorus vetulus Dasch, 1974 c g
 Mesochorus viator Schwenke, 2004 c g
 Mesochorus villosus Dasch, 1974 c g
 Mesochorus vinnulus Dasch, 1974 c g
 Mesochorus virgatus Schwenke, 1999 c g
 Mesochorus vittator (Zetterstedt, 1838) c g
 Mesochorus vitticollis Holmgren, 1860 c g
 Mesochorus windsorianus Schwenke, 2004 c g
 Mesochorus xanthurus Dasch, 1974 c g
 Mesochorus yosemite Dasch, 1971 c g
 Mesochorus zoerneri Schwenke, 1999 c g
 Mesochorus zonatus Dasch, 1974 c g
 Mesochorus zwakhalsi Schwenke, 2004 c g
 Mesochorus zwettleus Schwenke, 1999 c g
 Mesochorus zygaenae Schwenke, 1999 c g
 Mesochorus zyganaus Schwenke, 1999 c g

Data sources: i = ITIS, c = Catalogue of Life, g = GBIF, b = Bugguide.net

References

Mesochorus